Encantado is an unincorporated community and census-designated place (CDP) in Santa Fe County, New Mexico, United States. It was first listed as a CDP prior to the 2020 census.

The CDP is in northern Santa Fe County and is bordered to the north by Chupadero and to the west by Peak Place. New Mexico State Road 592 forms the northwest border of the CDP and leads southwest  to U.S. Routes 84/285.

Demographics

Education
It is within Santa Fe Public Schools.

References 

Census-designated places in Santa Fe County, New Mexico
Census-designated places in New Mexico